Jenna Leigh Johnson (born September 11, 1967) is an American former competition swimmer and Olympic gold medalist.

As a 16-year-old, Johnson represented the United States at the 1984 Summer Olympics in Los Angeles, California.  She won three medals: a gold medal in the women's 4×100-meter freestyle relay, a gold medal in the 4×100-meter medley relay, and a silver medal in the 100-meter butterfly.

She attended and swam for Ursuline High School in Santa Rosa her freshman and sophomore years. She swam for the Santa Rosa Neptunes Swim Club in Santa Rosa from age 12-15.  She is an alumna of Whittier Christian High School, where in 1984 she set the national record of 53.95 seconds in the 100-yard butterfly and the D1 record of 23.07 seconds in the 50-yard freestyle.  While living in Southern California, she trained at the Industry Hills Aquatic Club in the City of Industry, California.  She received an athletic scholarship to attend Stanford University, where she swam for the Stanford Cardinal swimming and diving team in National Collegiate Athletic Association (NCAA) and Pacific-10 Conference competition.  As a 19-year-old, she received the Honda Sports Award for Swimming and Diving, recognizing her as the outstanding college female swimmer of the year in 1985–86, was a runner-up for the award the following year and won again in 1988–89.

Johnson made Rivals.com's list for the "Top 100 Female Athletes In State History."

See also
 List of Olympic medalists in swimming (women)
 List of Stanford University people
 List of World Aquatics Championships medalists in swimming (women)

References

External links
 

1967 births
Living people
American female butterfly swimmers
American female freestyle swimmers
Olympic gold medalists for the United States in swimming
Olympic silver medalists for the United States in swimming
Sportspeople from Santa Rosa, California
Stanford Cardinal women's swimmers
Swimmers at the 1984 Summer Olympics
World Aquatics Championships medalists in swimming
Medalists at the 1984 Summer Olympics
Universiade medalists in swimming
Universiade gold medalists for the United States
Universiade silver medalists for the United States
Medalists at the 1985 Summer Universiade